Thyromental distance (TMD) measurement is a method commonly used to predict the difficulty of intubation and is measured from the thyroid notch to the tip of the jaw with the head extended. If it is less than 7.0 cm with hard scarred tissues, it indicates possible difficult intubation.

See also
 Mallampati score
 Simplified Airway Risk Index

References

Anesthesia